Lower Grosvenor Street was a street in London, England, later renamed Grosvenor Street. It was at the south-eastern corner of Grosvenor Square, extending eastward towards Bond Street. Count de Melfort, in his Impressions of England, described the street as consisting of "a great number of excellent houses, the majority of which are inhabited by titled persons and affluent families".

 12 Lower Grosvenor Street was home to the Alexandra Club, a private members club for women in Edwardian London. The club was founded in 1884, and closed in 1939.
 16 Lower Grosvenor Street was for some time the home of the Royal Institute of British Architects.
 46 was built by William Benson in 1725. In 1899 it was purchased by Sir Edgar Speyer, who had the building remodelled by Detmar Blow in 1910–11. After the first World War, it was used as the American Women's Club of London and later became the Japanese Embassy.

References

External links 
 

Streets in the City of Westminster